Gurcharan Rampuri (Punjabi: ਗੁਰਚਰਨ ਰਾਮਪੁਰੀ; January 23, 1929 – October 8, 2018) was a Canadian poet of Punjabi descent who writes in the Punjabi language.  He lived in Coquitlam, British Columbia.

Rampuri has been writing poems in Punjabi for well over 60 years.  He lives in Vancouver, BC, where he has lived since 1964.  In May 2011, Weavers Press in San Francisco (a member of Small Press Distribution) brought out The Circle of Illusion, a collection of Rampuri's poems translated into English by Amritjit Singh of Ohio University and Judy Ray of Tucson, AZ.

Works
Kankan di Khushbo
Qaul Qarar
Ahnnee Gali
Kanchni
Qatalgah
Agnaar
Kirnan da Ahlanan

Awards
 K.S. Dhaliwal Award, Ludhiana, India, 1997.
 Nand Lal Noorpuri Award, Yuba City, USA, 1987.
 Panjab Languages Department, Patiala, India, 1984.
 Panjabi Sahit Akadamy, Chandigarh, India, 1982.
 Panjabi Likhari Sabha (Writers Society) Rampur, India, 1980.

References

20th-century Canadian poets
Canadian male poets
People from Coquitlam
Canadian writers of Asian descent
Rampuri, Gurcharan
2018 deaths
20th-century Canadian male writers
1929 births